Varsha Bollamma is an Indian actress who predominantly works in Tamil and Telugu films. She debuted in the Tamil film Sathuran (2015). Her works include Yaanum Theeyavan (2017), Kalyanam (2018),  Seemathurai (2018) and Bigil (2019).

Early life and career 
Varsha was born in Coorg, Karnataka and brought up in Bangalore. She graduated in microbiology from Mount Carmel College, Bangalore. She is fluent in Kannada, Tamil, and Malayalam and has learnt to speak Telugu as well. 

Varsha initially became known for Dubsmash videos of Nazriya Nazim's dialogue in Raja Rani. Varsha made her acting debut with the film Sathuran (2015). Varsha played an important role in Vetrivel (2016) with M. Sasikumar. She played the daughter of Prabhu. Her other films are Ivan Yarendru Therikiratha (2017) and Yaanum Theeyavan (2017). Varsha made her Malayalam debut in 2018 with the film, Kalyanam. In the same year, she played in another Malayalam movie, Mandharam with Asif Ali. She played a small role, in '96 alongside Vijay Sethupathi and Trisha, which made her name in Tamil films. She also played in Seemathurai.  In 2019, she acted in Samuthirakani starrer Pettikadai.  Her third Malayalam film came in the year 2019. She played in Soothrakkaran with Gokul Suresh. 

She played a football player in Bigil (2019) scripted and directed by Atlee.

Filmography

Webseries

References

External links

Living people
Indian film actresses
Actresses in Tamil cinema
Actresses in Malayalam cinema
Year of birth missing (living people)
Actresses in Telugu cinema
Actresses from Bangalore
People from Kodagu district